Aloha Petroleum, Ltd. is one of the largest gasoline marketers and convenience store operators in Hawaii, with a history that dates back to the early 1900s. Until 1989, Aloha was a subsidiary of Harken Energy. Aloha employs more than 800 Hawaii residents and markets through approximately 100 Shell, Aloha, and Mahalo branded fueling stations and 50 Aloha Island Marts, four Menehune Food Marts, three Subways, and four Dunkin’ Donuts restaurants throughout the state. In 2014, Aloha was acquired by Sunoco. In 2016 Aloha was awarded the exclusive Dunkin' Donuts franchise for the state of Hawaii.

References

External links
Aloha Petroleum - official website

Companies based in Hawaii
Retail companies based in Hawaii
Oil companies of the United States
Companies based in Honolulu
Gas stations in the United States
2014 mergers and acquisitions
Sunoco LP